Abierto 24 horas (English: Open 24 hours) was a Spanish sitcom which aired 34 episodes between 2000 and 2001. It was directed by José Miguel Ganga and was aired by Antena 3.

The plot centers on an extravagant commercial establishment called De sol a sol, owned by the Morcillo family.

Cast
Pilar Bardem
Luis Merlo
Santiago Nogués
Beatriz Rico
Juán Khun
Pedro Reyes
Lola Lemos
Sonia Jávaga
José Lifante

References

2000 Spanish television series debuts
2001 Spanish television series endings